Navsari Lok Sabha constituency is one of the 26 Lok Sabha (lower house of Indian parliament) constituencies in Gujarat, a state in western India. This constituency was created as a part of the implementation of delimitation of parliamentary constituencies in 2008. It first held elections in 2009 and its first member of parliament (MP) was Chandrakant Raghunath Patil of the Bharatiya Janata Party. As of the latest elections in 2019, Patil represents this constituency.

Assembly segments
As of 2014, Navsari Lok Sabha constituency comprises seven Vidhan Sabha (legislative assembly) segments. These are:

Members of Parliament

Election results

General election 2019

General election 2014

General election 2009

See also
 Surat district
 Navsari district
 List of Constituencies of the Lok Sabha

References

Lok Sabha constituencies in Gujarat
Navsari district